Sudhakarrao Rajusing Naik (21 August 1934 – 10 May 2001) was an Indian politician from Indian National Congress party who served as Chief Minister of Maharashtra from 25 June 1991 until 22 February 1993 following the communal riots. He had given the new shape to the Panchayat Raj, started the continuous election process in Panchayat Raj systems all over the state, as desired by the former Prime Minister Rajeev Gandhi, decentralisation of power and faster decision making process being motive of bringing back the Panchayat Raj in full-fledged functioning. He is called as the hero of Jalkranti, who started the irrigation revolution in the State of Maharashtra.

Career
He started his political career from his rural base as Sarpanch or village head. He was Member of Legislative Assembly for Maharashtra Vidhan Sabha from Pusad (Vidhan Sabha constituency) 5 times winning elections of 1978, 1980, 1985, 1990 and 1999 elections. He was the Chief Minister during the Mumbai riots of 1992–1993.

However, politically, his differences with Sharad Pawar grew, and ultimately he had to resign.  At one point, Sudhakarrao made a statement that Sharad Pawar had asked him to
"go easy on Pappu Kalani".

He is also remembered for his work in water conservation.

He served as governor of Himachal Pradesh from 30 July 1994 to 17 September 1995. In 1998, he was elected as Member of parliament to the 12th Lok Sabha from Washim (Lok Sabha constituency).

References

External links
 Official Biographical Sketch in Lok Sabha Website

1934 births
2001 deaths
Chief Ministers of Maharashtra
Indian National Congress politicians from Maharashtra
Nationalist Congress Party politicians from Maharashtra
Maharashtra MLAs 1978–1980
Maharashtra MLAs 1980–1985
Maharashtra MLAs 1985–1990
Maharashtra MLAs 1990–1995
Maharashtra MLAs 1999–2004
Governors of Himachal Pradesh
India MPs 1998–1999
Lok Sabha members from Maharashtra
People from Yavatmal district
Chief ministers from Indian National Congress
Marathi politicians
People from Washim